This list of current UFC fighters records current Ultimate Fighting Championship (UFC) fighters' information, country origins, recent fighter signings and departures, fight schedules and results and the champion of each division.  , the UFC roster consisted of fighters from 71 countries.

Notes/key 
 This list provides an up-to-date roster of all fighters currently competing under the UFC promotional banner. The list excluded fighters who have not fought for more than two years and are not subjected to suspension.
 All names presented are in accordance with Sherdog website profiles and may include common nicknames or alternative spellings rather than birth names.
 Fighters are organized by weight class and within their weight class by their date of debut in the Endeavor (WEC, Strikeforce or UFC - which ever the earliest debut date).
 Endeavor records below are based on the combination of total fights which fighters fought under UFC, Strikeforce and WEC.
 MMA records below are retrieved from Sherdog's website.
 All asterisked fighters are listed by a combination of their UFC, Strikeforce and WEC records.
 The flags listed in these tables are in accordance with the Sherdog's website and may not fully or accurately represent the full citizenship of the peoples listed. 
WC = Weight Class; G = Gender; SW = Strawweight; FYW = Flyweight; BW = Bantamweight; FW = Featherweight; LW = Lightweight; WW = Welterweight; MW = Middleweight; LHW = Light heavyweight; HW = Heavyweight; WSW = Women's strawweight; WFYW = Women's flyweight; WBW = Women's bantamweight; and WFW = Women's featherweight.
 Fighters' age and height are based on information obtained from Sherdog's website.
 Each fight record has four categories: wins, losses, draws and no-contests (NC).
 Number of fighters in each division is counted as per date indicated only for the number could change week by week.
 Rankings are based on information obtained from the UFC's website and updated when information has been obtained from the UFC's website ( /  = movement in rankings, (C) = Champion, (IC) = Interim Champion, and (NR) = not previously ranked).
 The tables are sortable and the calculation for Endeavor and MMA records are formulated as follows: 
 Plus one point of the total wins for fighters having not lost a fight: 5–0–0 = 6
 Negative points of total losses for fighters having not won a fight: 0–3–0 = -3
 Add number of wins to the winning percentage: 10–1–0 = 10.90 | 10 + (10/11)
 A draw counts as 0.5: 8–4–1 = 8.65 | 8 + (8.5/13)
 No contest does not factor as one of the variables of the calculation: 8–2–0 (1 NC) = 8.80 | 8 + (8/10)

Recent releases and retirements
These fighters have either been released from their UFC contracts, or announced their retirement, over the course of the last month. If their release has not been announced, then they have been listed here based upon their removal from the UFC's rosters.

Recent signings 

The fighters in this section have either signed with the UFC but yet to be debuted, have recently returned from an announced retirement, or have yet to make their UFC return.

Suspended fighters
The list below is based on fighters suspended either by (1) United States Anti-Doping Agency (USADA) or World Anti-Doping Agency (WADA) for violation of taking prohibited substances or non-analytical incidents, (2) by local commissions on misconduct during the fights or at event venues, or (3) by UFC.

As of May 16, 2019, a total of 76 UFC fighters have been sanctioned by USADA since the UFC USADA testing program started.

Debuted fighters' countries of origin 

The flags listed in these tables are in accordance with the UFC's official telecasts and may not fully or accurately represent the full citizenship of the peoples listed.

Updated as of March 4, 2023 after UFC 285.

Rankings
The UFC rankings are rated by a panel made up of MMA media members. The panel votes for the top active fighters in the UFC by both weight class and pound-for-pound. A fighter can be ranked in multiple divisions at the same time in divisions they have competed. The champions and interim champions are placed in the top positions of their respective weight classes and only the champions are eligible to be voted for in the pound-for-pound rankings.

The rankings for the UFC's fighters are both recorded and updated when information has been obtained from the UFC's website.

Updated as of March 14, 2023, after UFC Fight Night: Yan vs. Dvalishvili.

Current champions, weight classes and status
The UFC currently uses nine different weight classes. This list of champions is updated as of March 5, 2023 after UFC 285.

Debuted fighters

Heavyweights (265 lb, 120 kg)

Light heavyweights (205 lb, 93 kg)

Middleweights (185 lb, 84 kg)

Welterweights (170 lb, 77 kg)

Lightweights (155 lb, 70 kg)

Featherweights (145 lb, 65 kg)

Bantamweights (135 lb, 61 kg)
{| class="wikitable sortable" style="text-align:center"
!width=3%|
!width=13%|Name
!width=3%|Age
!width=7%|Ht.
!width=13%|Nickname
!width=30%|Result / next fight / status
!width=3%|Ref
!width=12%|Endeavor record
!width=12%|MMA record

|-
|
| *
|
|
|Killer
|
|
|18–12
|28–13
|-
|
| *
|
|
|
|UFC Fight Night 222 (Las Vegas) - Montel Jackson
|
|17–7–1 (1 NC)
|28–10–1 (1 NC)
|-
|
| *
|
|
|Dominator
|
|
|14–4
|24–4
|-
|
|
|
|
|Mr. Perfect
|
|
|7–3 (1 NC)
|18–9 (1 NC)
|-
|
|
|
|
|Dangerous
| - UFC Fight Night 221 (Las Vegas)- Raphael Assunção 
|
|6–5
|15–6
|-
|
|
|
|
|D'Silva
|UFC Fight Night 224 (TBD) -  Cody Stamann
|
|6–5
|28–5 (1 NC)
|-
|
| (c)
|
|
|Funk Master
|UFC 288 (TBD) - Henry Cejudo
|
|14–3
|22–3
|-
|
|
|
|
|The Young Punisher
|UFC on ESPN 44 (Kansas City) - Chris Gutiérrez
|

|9–7 (2 NC)
|19–7 (2 NC)
|-
|
|
|
|
|
|UFC 287 (Miami) - Adrian Yanez
|
|9–5
|19–6
|-
|
|
|
|
|
|
|
|5–5
|13–7
|-
|
|
|
|
|Ninja
| - UFC Fight Night 221 (Las Vegas) - Mario Bautista
|
|4–6
|10–7
|-
|
|
|
|
|Chito
|UFC on ESPN 43 (Las Vegas) -  Cory Sandhagen
|
|14–6
|20–7–1
|-
|
|
|
|
|No Love
| - UFC 285 (Las Vegas) -  Trevin Jones
|
|8–5
|13–5
|-
|
|
|
|
|
|
|
|3–2
|9–2
|-
|
|
|
|
|Boom
|UFC Fight Night 223  (TBD)  – Journey Newson 
|
|8–7
|24–14
|-
|
|
|
|
|
|UFC Fight Night 224 (TBD) - Douglas Silva de Andrade
|
|7–4–1
|21–5–1
|-
|
||
|
|
|
|UFC Fight Night 222 (Las Vegas) -  Ricky Simón
|
|8–2–1
|19–7–1 (1 NC)
|-
|
|
|
|
|Sugar
|
|
|8–1 (1 NC)
|16–1 (1 NC)
|-
|
|
|
|
|
| - UFC Fight Night 221 (Las Vegas) - Petr Yan
|
|9–2
|16–4
|-
|
|
|
|
|
|(January 31, 2023) - Knee injury - Out of UFC 285 (Las Vegas) - Cody Garbrandt
|
|5–4
|18–6
|-
|
|
|
|
|
| UFC on ESPN 43 (Las Vegas) -  Marlon Vera
|  
|8–3
|15–4
|-
|
|
|
|
|
|UFC Fight Night 222 (Las Vegas) -  Song Yadong
|
|8–2
|20–3
|-
|
|
|
|
|
| -UFC Fight Night 217 (Las Vegas)  - Umar Nurmagomedov 
|
|6–3
|17–4
|-
|
|
|
|
|No Mercy
| - UFC Fight Night 221 (Las Vegas) - Merab Dvalishvili
|
|8–4
|16–5
|-
|
|
|
|
|
| - UFC Fight Night 221 (Las Vegas) - Jonathan Martinez
|
|6–2
|17–3
|-
|
|
|
|
|
|
|
|2–2
|13–7
|-
|
|
|
|
|Quik
|UFC Fight Night 222 (Las Vegas) - Rani Yahya
|
|6–2
|12–2
|-
|
| 
|
|
|Dragon
| - UFC Fight Night 221 (Las Vegas) - Said Nurmagomedov
|
|9–3
|18–4
|-
|
|
|
|
|El Guapo
|UFC on ESPN 44 (Kansas City) - Pedro Munhoz
|
|7–1–1
|19–4–2
|-
|
|
|
|
|
| - UFC Fight Night 221 (Las Vegas) - Guido Cannetti
|
|6–2
|12–2
|-
|
|
|
|
|
|
|
|5–3
|16–4–1
|-
|
|
|
|
|
|UFC Fight Night 223  (TBD)  – Brian Kelleher
|
|1–3 (1 NC)
|10–4 (1 NC)
|-
|
|
|
|
|
|
|
|4–1–1
|16–8–2
|-
|
|
|
|
|
|UFC Fight Night 222 (Las Vegas) - Brady Hiestand
|
|3–3
|10–4
|-
|
|
|
|
|Chapo
|
|
|4–2
|13–2
|-
|
|
|
|
|
| - UFC Fight Night 221 (Las Vegas) - Victor Henry
|
|4–4
|23–9
|-
|
|
|
|
|The Matrix
|(February 11, 2023 - Undisclosed reasons - Out of UFC Fight Night 221 (Las Vegas))- Raphael Assunção 
|
|4–1
|10–2
|-
|
|
|
|
|The Model
|UFC on ESPN 44 (Kansas City) -  Gastón Bolaños
|
|0–3
|12–4
|-
|
|
| 
|
|Sexi Mexi
|
|
|2–2
|19–6
|-
|
|
|
|
|Kid Kvenbo 
|
|
|2–2
|12–2
|-
|
|
|
|
|5 Star 
| - UFC 285 (Las Vegas)  - Cody Garbrandt
|
|1–4 (1 NC)
|13–10 (1 NC)
|-
|
|
|
|
|
|UFC 287 (Miami) - Rob Font
|
|5–0
|16–3
|-
|
|
|
|
|
| -UFC Fight Night 217 (Las Vegas)  -  Raoni Barcelos
|
|4–0
|16–0
|-
|
|
|
|
|
|
|
|3–2
|19–5
|-
|
|Ronnie Lawrence
|
|
|The Heat
|
|
|2–1
|8–2
|-
|
|
|
|
|Mongolian Murderer
|
|
|2–2
|24–9
|-
|
|Leomana Martinez
|
|
|Manaboi 
| - UFC 285 (Las Vegas) - Cameron Saaiman
|
|2–2
|10–4
|-
|
|Ricky Turcios
|
|
|Pretty Ricky
|
|
|2–1
|12–3
|-
|
|Brady Hiestand
|
|
|Bam Bam
|UFC Fight Night 222 (Las Vegas) -Danaa Batgerel
|
|1–1
|6–2
|-
|
|Saimon Oliveira
|
|
|
| - UFC 283 (Rio de Janeiro) - Daniel Marcos
|
|0–2
|18–5
|-
|
|Victor Henry  
|
|
|La Mangosta
| - UFC Fight Night 221 (Las Vegas) - Tony Gravely 
|
|2–1
|23–6
|-
|
|Christian Rodriguez
|
|
|CeeRod
|UFC 287 (Miami)  - Raul Rosas Jr. 
|
|1–1
|8–1
|-
|
|Chad Anheliger
|
|
|The Monster
|
|
|1–1
|12–6
|-
|
|Javid Basharat
|
|
|The Snow Leopard
| -UFC Fight Night 217 (Las Vegas) - Mateus Mendoncą
|
|3–0
|14–0
|-
|
|Daniel Santos
|
|
|Willycat
|
|
|1–1
|10–2
|-
|
|Fernie Garcia
|
|
|
|
|
|0–2
|10–3
|-
|
|Da'Mon Blackshear
|
|
|Da Monste
| - UFC 285 (Las Vegas) - Farid Basharat
|
|0–1–1
|12–5–1
|-
|
|Cristian Quiñónez
|
|
|Problema
|
|
|1–0
|18–3
|-
|
|Cameron Saaiman
|
|
|
| - UFC 285 (Las Vegas) - Leomana Martinez
|
|2–0
|8–0
|-
|
|Steven Koslow
|
|
|Obi Won Shinobi  The Pillow
|
|
|0–1
|6–1
|-
|
|Raul Rosas Jr.
|
|
|El Niño Problema
|UFC 287 (Miami)  - Christian Rodriguez
|
|1–0
|7–0
|-
|
|Mateus Mendonçą
|
|
|Bocão
| - UFC Fight Night 217 (Las Vegas) - Javid Basharat
|
|0–1
|10–1
|-
|
|Daniel Marcos
|
|
|Soncora
| - UFC 283 (Rio de Janeiro) - Saimon Oliveira
|
|1–0
|14–0
|-
|
|Luan Lacerda
|
|
|
| - UFC 283 (Rio de Janeiro) - Cody Stamann
|
|0–1
|12–2
|-
|
|
|
|
|Hybrid
| - UFC Fight Night 218 (Las Vegas) - Toshiomi Kazama
|
|1–0
|7–0
|-
|
|Toshiomi Kazama
|
|
|Silent Finisher
| - UFC Fight Night 218 (Las Vegas) - Rinya Nakamura
|
|0–1
|10–3
|-
|
|Farid Basharat
|
|
|Ferocious
| - UFC 285 (Las Vegas) - Da’Mon Blackshear 
|
|1–0
|10–0
|-
|}

Flyweights (125 lb, 56 kg)
{| class="wikitable sortable" style="text-align:center"
!width=3%|
!width=13%|Name
!width=3%|Age
!width=7%|Ht.
!width=13%|Nickname
!width=30%|Result / next fight / status
!width=3%|Ref
!width=12%|Endeavor record
!width=12%|MMA record
|-
|
|
|
|
|
|UFC Fight Night 226 (TBD) - Allan Nascimento
|
|7–10
|17–13–1
|-
|
|
|
|
|
|UFC on ESPN 44 (Kansas City) - Brandon Royval
|
|7–1
|19–2–1
|-
|
| (c)
|
|
|The Assassin Baby
| - UFC 283 (Rio de Janeiro) - Deiveson Figueiredo
| 
|10–3–2
|21–6–2
|-
|
|
|
|
|Danger
|
|
|6–5 (1 NC)
|16–8 (1 NC)
|-
|
|
|
|
|
|
|
|9–3
|25–5
|-
|
| (c)
|
|
|Deus da Guerra
| - UFC 283 (Rio de Janeiro) - Brandon Moreno
| 
|10–3–1
|21–3–1
|-
|
|
|
|
|
|UFC on ESPN 43 (San Antonio) - Manel Kape 
|
|6–3
|24–7
|-
|
| 
|
|
|The Tibetan Eagle
|
|
|3–2
|16–5
|-
|
|
|
|
|Don't Blink
|UFC Fight Night 226 (TBD) - Amir Albazi
|
|7–3
|24–10 (1 NC)
|-
|
|
|
|
|
| - UFC Fight Night 221 (Las Vegas) - Bruno Gustavo da Silva
|
|3–4
|21–13–1
|-
|
|
|
|
|Bulldog
| - UFC Fight Night 221 (Las Vegas) - Tyson Nam
|
|3–2 (1 NC)
|13–5–2 (1 NC)
|-
|
|
|
|
|The Oddity
| - UFC Fight Night 220 (Las Vegas)  -   Charles Johnson
|
|4–3
|12–5–0 (1 NC)
|-
|
|
|
| 
|The Undertaker
|
|
|3–2
|20–5
|-
|
|
|
| 
|Raw Dawg
|UFC on ESPN 44 (Kansas City) - Matheus Nicolau
|
|4–2
|14–6
|-
|
|
| 
|
|
|UFC 288 (Newark) - Nate Maness
|
|1–5
|14–8
|-
|
|
| 
|
|X
| - UFC 286 (London) - Jake Hadley
|
|2–4
|14–7
|-
|
|
|
|
|The Prince
|UFC Fight Night 226 (TBD) - Kai Kara-France
|
|4–0
|16–1
|-
|
|
|
|
|
|UFC Fight Night 223 (TBD) - Charles Johnson
|
|3–2–1
|14–4–1
|-
|
|
| 
|
|Mayhem
|UFC 288 (Newark) - Zhalgas Zhumagulov
|
|3–2
|14–3
|-
|
| 
|
|
|Gifted
|
|
|3–1
|14–2
|-
|
|Jimmy Flick
|
|
|The Brick
| -  UFC Fight Night 217  (Las Vegas)  – Charles Johnson
|
|1–1
|16–6
|-
|
|
|
|
|Starboy
|UFC on ESPN 43 (San Antonio) - Alex Perez
|
|3–2
|18–6
|-
|
|JP Buys
|
|
|Young Savage
|
|
|0–3
|9–5
|-
|
|
|
|
|El Jefe
| Suspended by the NYAC and NSAC and temporary barred from UFC -  linked to the investigation that began as a result of suspicious betting activity ahead of the Nov. 5 UFC fight between Darrick Minner 
|

|3–0
|11–2
|-
|
|Juancamilo Ronderos
|
|
| 
| -  UFC Fight Night 219  (Las Vegas)  - Clayton Carpenter
|
|0–2
|4–2
|-
|
|Daniel da Silva
|
|
|Miojo
|UFC on ESPN 43 (San Antonio) – C.J. Vergara
|
|0–3
|11–4
|-
|
|Allan Nascimento 
|
|
|Puro Osso
|UFC Fight Night 226 (TBD) -  Tim Elliott 
|
|2–1
|20–6
|-
|
|C.J. Vergara
|
|
|
|UFC on ESPN 43 (San Antonio) – Daniel da Silva
|
|1–2
|10–4
|-
|
|Denys Bondar
|
|
|Psycho 
|(February 15, 2023) - Undisclosed reasons - Out of UFC Fight Night 220 (Las Vegas) -  Ode' Osbourne
|
|0–1
|16–4
|-
|
|Victor Altamirano
|
|
|El Magnifico
|UFC on ESPN 43 ( San Antonio) - Vinicius Salvador
|
|1–1
|11–2
|-
|
|Carlos Hernandez
|
|
|
| -  UFC Fight Night 217  (Las Vegas)  - Allan Nascimento
|
|1–1
|8–2
|-
|
|
|
|
|The Punisher
| - UFC 286 (London) - Jafel Filho
|
|4–0
|10–0 (1 NC)
|-
|
|Kleydson Rodrigues
|
|
|KR
| - UFC 284 (Perth) - Shannon Ross
|
|1–1
|8–2
|-
|
|Carlos Candelario
|
|
|The Cannon
|UFC Fight Night 222 (Las Vegas) - Rafael Estevam
|
|0–2
|8–3
|-
|
|Tatsuro Taira 
|
|
|
| - UFC Fight Night 218 (Las Vegas)  - Jesús Santos Aguilar
|
|3–0
|13–0
|-
|
|Jake Hadley
|
|
|White Kong
| - UFC 286 (London) - Malcolm Gordon
|
|2–1
|10–1
|-
|
|Charles Johnson
|
|
|InnerG
|UFC Fight Night 224 (TBD) - Cody Durden
|
|2–2
|13–4
|-
|
|Alessandro Costa
|
|
|Nono
|
|
|0–1
|12–3
|-
|
|Jesus Santos Aguilar
|
|
|
| -  UFC Fight Night 218  (Las Vegas) -Tatsuro Taira  
|
|0–1
|8–2
|-
|
|Park Hyun-sung
|
|
|Peace of Mind
| - UFC Fight Night 218 (Las Vegas)  - Seung Guk Choi
|
|1–0
|8–0
|-
|
|Choi Seung-guk
|
|
|
| - UFC Fight Night 218 (Las Vegas)  - Hyun Sung Park
|
|0–1
|6–2
|-
|
|Shannon Ross
|
|
|The Turkish Delight
| - UFC 284 (Perth) - Kleydson Rodrigues
|
|0–1
|13–7
|-
|
|Clayton Carpenter
|
|
|Concrete
| - UFC Fight Night 219 (Las Vegas) - Juancamilo Ronderos 
|
|1–0
|7–0
|-
|
|Jafel Filho
|
|
|Pastor
| - UFC 286 (London) - Muhammad Mokaev
|
|0–1
|14–3
|-
|}

Women's featherweights (145 lb, 65 kg)

Women's bantamweights (135 lb, 61 kg)

Women's flyweights (125 lb, 56 kg)

Women's strawweights (115 lb, 52 kg)

See also

List of UFC champions
List of UFC events
List of current ACA fighters
List of current Bellator MMA fighters
List of current Brave CF fighters
List of current Combate Global fighters
List of current Invicta FC fighters
List of current KSW fighters
List of current ONE fighters
List of current Professional Fighters League fighters
List of current Rizin FF fighters
List of current Road FC fighters

Notes

References

Ultimate Fighting Championship
UFC fighters
UFC fighters